Victoria University of Bangladesh is a private university located at Dhaka, Bangladesh. It was established in May 2003 by the Private University Act 1992. The university has 5,000 students.

History
The foundation of Victoria University of Bangladesh is laid on Global Institute of Business and Technology (GIBT), Dhaka – the only approved educational partner center of Victoria University of Wellington (VUW) in South Asia – which started functioning in 1999. In March 2001 it signed a partnership agreement with Victoria University of Wellington, New Zealand. The partnership agreement was designed to jointly provide degree programs for students with facilities for studies both at GIBT and VUW leading to VUW degrees.
GIBT merged with Victoria University of Bangladesh when the latter was accorded permission on 31 May 2003 by the Government of Bangladesh to function as a full-fledged university under the Private University Act. The university was established with sole sponsorship of Mr. K.B.M. Moin Uddin Chisty, a philanthropist.

Faculties and departments
The university consists of the following faculties and departments:

School of Business and Management
Department of Business Administration
 Bachelor of Business Administration (Honours) (126 credits) (Majors in Marketing, Finance, HRM & Industrial Relations, E-Commerce, Information System, International Business, Accounting, Management, Islamic Banking, Insurance)
 Master of Business Administration, (regular 66 credits)
 Executive MBA (42 Credits)
Department of Tourism and Hospitality Management
 Bachelor of Tourism & Hospitality Management (Honours) (126 credits)
School of Arts and Humanities
Department of Arts and Humanities
 Bachelor of Arts (Honours) in English (120 credits)
 Master of Arts in English (1 year 33 credits)
 Master of Arts in English (2 years 60 credits)
School of Science
Department of Computer Science and Information Technology
 Bachelor of Science in Computer Science and Information Technology
 Bachelor of Science in Computer Science and Engineering
School of Education & Training
 Bachelor of Education (Honours)

The university provides double majors without any extra credits hours requirement.

List of vice-chancellors 
 Prof. Asit Roy Choudhury ( Current ).

Amenities
 Health-Care Facilities
 High Speed Internet Facilities
 Modern Computer Lab
 Web Library

Scholarships
 VUB Founder & President Scholarship
 Merit Scholarship

References

External links
 

Private universities in Bangladesh
Educational institutions established in 2003
Universities and colleges in Dhaka
2003 establishments in Bangladesh